Henri Danoy, in Catalan, Enric Danoy i Bru (Saint-Laurent-de-la-Salanque, 27 January 1859 – 22 August 1928) was a French playwright and linguistic.

With his friend Simon Siné, he created a sort of Roussillonaise operetta. His works are valued by Catalan-language scholars.

Works

In Catalan language
Hast'à (sic) la Mort!. Imprimerie Barrière, Perpinyà, 1924

In French language
La truffe noire et les truffières rationnelles dans le département du Vaucluse, contenant une préface sur la Mutualité Agricole par M.M Henry Danoy et Joseph Martin, propriétaire, Editorial Seguin, Avinyó, 1910

In Occitan language
Esteleto, la fado di tourre d'Ate. Imprimerie Lanet, Ate, 1911
Mouloun d'auvàri en sounetoun prouvençau. Imprimerie Lanet, Ate, 1912
Garço m'acò dins lou Couloun. Imprimerie Lanet, Ate, 1912
''Embaumo!, Imprimerie Mistral, Cavalhon, 1921

1859 births
1928 deaths
French male writers